Ass most commonly refers to:
 Buttocks (in informal American English)
 Donkey or ass, Equus africanus asinus
any other member of the subgenus Asinus

Ass or ASS may also refer to:

Art and entertainment
 Ass (album), 1973 album by the band Badfinger
 "Ass", a 2016 song by Momus from his 2016 album Scobberlotchers
 ASS Altenburger, a German playing card manufacturer
 Agents of Secret Stuff, a 2010 action comedy film

Science and technology
 ASS (car), a French car made from 1919 to 1920
 ASS (gene), a human gene that encodes for the enzyme argininosuccinate synthetase
 Ass (M), in abstract algebra, denotes the collection of all associated primes of a module M
 Advanced SubStation Alpha (extension .ass), a file format used for subtitles
 Angle-side-side, condition in geometry that does not prove congruence of two triangles (also called SSA)
 Arsenic sulfide, the basic chemical formula AsS

Other uses
 áss, one of the Æsir in Old Norse mythology
Advisory Service for Squatters, a non-profit group based in London, UK

See also
 Arse (disambiguation)
 AS (disambiguation)
 As (Roman coin), plural form asses
 Assessment (disambiguation)
 Asshole (disambiguation)
 Asse (disambiguation)
 Asso, a town and commune in Lombardy, Italy
 Jackass (disambiguation)
 Paul van Ass, Dutch field hockey coach
 Wild ass (disambiguation)